Hällevadsholm is a locality situated in Munkedal Municipality, Västra Götaland County, Sweden with 772 inhabitants in 2010. An Iron Age grave field, Stenehed, is located nearby.

References 

Populated places in Västra Götaland County
Populated places in Munkedal Municipality